Rune Brynhildsen (born 26 June 1965) is a former Norwegian journalist and CEO of Norway's leading commercial radio station, P4 Radio Hele Norge, as well as owner of the consultancy Brynhildsen Woldsdal Public Relations.

On 11 June 2007 he was convicted of insider trading and sentenced to ten months in prison.  was confiscated.

Brynhildsen reported to Vestoppland Prison in Valdres in the autumn of 2008 to begin serving his sentence. He was released from prison some weeks later, pending his appeal.

He is the father of Ola Brynhildsen.

References

1965 births
Living people
Norwegian journalists
Norwegian radio personalities
People convicted of insider trading
Norwegian prisoners and detainees
Prisoners and detainees of Norway
Place of birth missing (living people)